Building for the Future is a 2013 Indian documentary film about the design, engineering and construction of the tallest building in India – The Palais Royale.

This documentary film has been directed by John Michael Owen. It has been produced by Vidhi Kasliwal. Gautam Pemmaraju is the writer of the film. Grafik Fever has worked on the VFX in the film.

This documentary film is a Landmarc films presentation.

It won Best VFX at the 4th Indian Advertising & Corporate Film Festival – 15.

References

External links

2013 films
Indian short documentary films
2013 short documentary films